Elizabeth Martha Brown (c. 1811 – 9 August 1856), née Clark, was the last woman to be publicly hanged in Dorset, England. She was executed outside Dorchester Prison after being convicted of the murder of her second husband, John Brown, on 5 July, just thirty-five days earlier. The prosecution said she had attacked him with an axe after he had taken a whip to her.

Background
Among the crowd of 3,000–4,000 spectators who watched Brown's execution was the English novelist Thomas Hardy, aged 16 at the time, standing close to the gallows. He wrote seventy years later that he was ashamed to have been there. Brown was dressed in a long black silk dress. A cloth was placed over her head, but as it began to rain, her face became visible again. Hardy wrote, "I saw—they had put a cloth over the face—how, as the cloth got wet, her features came through it. That was extraordinary." "I remember what a fine figure she showed against the sky as she hung in the misty rain," he wrote elsewhere, "and how the tight black silk gown set off her shape as she wheeled half-round and back." Blake Morrison writes that the hanging of Tess in Hardy's Tess of the d'Urbervilles (1891) reflected his experience of watching Brown's death.

A local newspaper recorded that she was counselled just before her death by the Rev. D Clementson, the prison chaplain, and that she remained composed:

This morning (Saturday) a few minutes after 8 o'clock, Elizabeth Martha BROWN, convicted of the wilful murder of her husband was executed on a scaffold erected over the gateway of the new entrance leading to Dorset County Goal from North Square. The culpret did not up to the last moment, appear to shed a tear. She on leaving her cell, shook hands with the chief warder and other officers. On her way to the scaffold her demeanour was extraordinary. The attendants on either side were entirely overcome, whilst she bore her awful position with the greatest resignation and composure. The Chaplain the Rev. D Clementson, conversed with her on spiritual subjects, and she appeared to engage in  devotion and prayer, with her hands clasped firmly together and upturned eyes. On arriving at the place of execution she walked with firmness up the first flight of eleven steps. On this spot the ceremony of pinioning was proceeded with. Her female attendants here left her in the care of the executioner.

Remains
In 2016, it was reported that remains unearthed at the site of Dorchester prison in Dorset may belong to Brown. In 2018 it was reported that Martha may be re-buried with others in the Poundbury Cemetery, should she not be buried in the churchyard at Blackdown, where her husband's remains lie.

In popular culture
A Dorset-based company, Angel Exit Theatre, produced a play called The Ballad of Martha Brown based on the life and times of Martha Brown. The play premiered at Deverills Festival in Wiltshire on 3 May 2014 and continued on a tour of the South West and South East. In September - October 2015 it again toured the UK.

In 1995, Australian band The Lucksmiths released the track "Thomas & Martha" based on Thomas Hardy's recollections of the event.

The case was re-examined in the BBC programme Murder, Mystery and My Family (series 4, episode 9).

Notes

Further reading
Clark, Richard (2008). Women and the Noose: A History of Female Execution. Tempus. , 
Knelman, Judith (1998). Twisting in the Wind: The Murderess and the English Press. University of Toronto Press. , 
Thorne, Nicola (2000). My Name is Martha Brown. Harper Collins. , 
Millgate, Michael (2006). Thomas Hardy: A Biography Revisited. Oxford University Press. ,

External links
Dorset Echo (2000). "The Mystery of Martha Brown", 11 November 2000.
Rev. D Clementson, Fordington newspaper (1856). Fordington newspaper transcripts, dated 11 August 1856. Ancestry.com, accessed 21 January 2010.
Morrison, Blake (2008). 'What a fine figure she showed as she hung in the misty rain', The Guardian, 2 August 2008.

1811 births
1856 deaths
People executed for murder
Executed English people
British female murderers
19th-century executions by England and Wales
People convicted of murder by England and Wales
Women of the Victorian era
English people convicted of murder
1856 murders in the United Kingdom
Mariticides